Gabriela Pérez Paredes (1938 – 9 November 2022) was a Chilean lawyer and judge.

Pérez died on 9 November 2022.

References

1938 births
2022 deaths
Chilean women lawyers
Chilean judges
Supreme Court of Chile members
University of Chile alumni
People from Rengo